Navghar-Manikpur is a city and a municipal council in Thane district in the Indian state of Maharashtra.

Demographics
 India census, Navghar-Manikpur had a population of 116,700. Males constitute 53% of the population and females 47%. Navghar-Manikpur has an average literacy rate of 83%, higher than the national average of 59.5%: male literacy is 85%, and female literacy is 81%. In Navghar-Manikpur, 11% of the population is under 6 years of age.

Among minority languages, Gujarati is spoken by 23.78% of the population and Hindi by 18.24%.

References

Cities and towns in Thane district

sv:Navghar-Manikpur